Kasprzak is a Polish surname. Notable people with the surname include:

 Anna Kasprzak (born 1989), Danish equestrian
 Krzysztof Kasprzak (born 1984), Polish speedway rider
 Mieczysław Kasprzak (born 1953), Polish politician
 Robert Kasprzak (born 1987), Polish speedway rider
 Róża Kasprzak (born 1982), Polish athlete
 Urszula Kasprzak (born 1960), Polish singer
 Zdzisław Kasprzak (1910-1971), Polish basketball player

Polish-language surnames